Still Writing in My Diary: 2nd Entry, released in 2004, is the second studio album by rapper Petey Pablo. The album debuted at number 4 on the Billboard 200 chart with first-week sales of 117,000 copies in the US and is certified Gold by the RIAA. It includes the popular single "Freek-a-Leek", which peaked at number 7 on the Billboard Hot 100.

Track listing

Leftover tracks
 "Blow Your Whistle" (produced by Mannie Fresh)
 "Whole Wide World" (featuring Missy Elliott)

Charts

Weekly charts

Year-end charts

References

2004 albums
Petey Pablo albums
Albums produced by Bangladesh (record producer)
Albums produced by Focus...
Albums produced by Kanye West
Albums produced by Timbaland
Albums produced by Lil Jon
Albums produced by Mannie Fresh
Albums produced by Scott Storch
Albums produced by Warryn Campbell
Jive Records albums
Sequel albums